Paul Wheeler (born 3 January 1965) is a Welsh former professional footballer.

Career
Born in Caerphilly, Wheeler began his career at Bristol Rovers, signing as an apprentice after being spotted by one of the clubs scouts Stan Montgomery who scouting the South Wales area. He was released after two years, having never made a league appearance for the club, and returned to Wales where he worked as a caretaker at Cyncoed College while playing Welsh league football with Taffs Well and Aberaman which he scored 31 goals.

He went on to join Cardiff City after impressing enough in a trial match for manager Alan Durban to offer him a full contract. He quickly became a regular in the side and made his first league appearance against derby county in division 2 suffering relegation in his first year before helping them to promotion during the 1987–88 season and winning the Welsh cup. He was released by the club in 1989 and joined Hull City on non-contract terms before having spells at Hereford United and Stockport County where he played at wembley twice in the autoglass final and the division 3 playoffs. before ending his league career with Chester City. They were relegated in the 1992–93 but their promotion season from Division Three the following year included a hat–trick in a 4–0 win at Mansfield Town. He left the club at the end of the season.

He then moved into non-league football with Stalybridge Celtic, Leigh RMI and Winsford United.

References

1965 births
Welsh footballers
Cardiff City F.C. players
Hull City A.F.C. players
Hereford United F.C. players
Stockport County F.C. players
Scarborough F.C. players
Chester City F.C. players
Stalybridge Celtic F.C. players
Leigh Genesis F.C. players
Winsford United F.C. players
English Football League players
National League (English football) players
Living people
Association football forwards
Association football midfielders
Taff's Well A.F.C. players
Aberaman Athletic F.C. players